Pinalia multiflora is a species of orchid found in Java, the Lesser Sunda Islands and Sumatra.

References

multiflora
Orchids of Indonesia
Plants described in 1825